Simone Melanie Laudehr (born 12 July 1986) is a German former footballer who played as a central midfielder or winger.

Career

Club
Laudehr began her career at the age of three at FC Tegernheim. In 1996, she joined SC Regensburg, before playing for FC Bayern Munich for one season. At Bayern she made her Bundesliga debut. Laudehr transferred to FCR 2001 Duisburg in 2004, where she was runner-up in the Bundesliga five times, including four seasons in a row from 2005 to 2008. She won the German Cup twice with Duisburg and claimed the UEFA Women's Cup with the club in the 2008–09 season. For the 2012–2013 season she moved to 1. FFC Frankfurt. She extended her contract until the 2016–17 season on 21 April 2015.

In 2016, Laudehr joined Bayern Munich. Prior to the end of the 2020–21 season, Laudehr announced her retirement from football. She won the first and only league title of her career on the final matchday of the 2020–21 Frauen-Bundesliga, making her 210th Bundesliga appearance by substituting into the match with 10 minutes to spare.

International

In 2004, Laudehr was runner-up with Germany at the 2004 UEFA Women's U-19 Championship and later that year won the 2004 FIFA U-19 Women's World Championship. She made her debut for the German senior national team in July 2007 against Denmark. Only two months later she was part of Germany's 2007 FIFA Women's World Cup squad. Laudehr was a starter for Germany in five matches, including in the World Cup final, in which she scored after 86 minutes to seal the German 2–0 victory. Her World Cup winning header was later voted Germany's Goal of the Month.

One year later, she won the bronze medal at the 2008 Summer Olympics and was part of Germany's team which won the country's seventh title at the 2009 European Championship. Laudehr has been called up for Germany's 2011 FIFA Women's World Cup squad.

She was part of the squad for the 2016 Summer Olympics, where Germany won the gold medal.

In 2019, she retired from the Germany national team after being left out of their squad for the 2019 FIFA Women's World Cup.

International goals
Scores and results list Germany's goal tally first:

Source:

Personal life
Laudehr was born in Regensburg, Bavaria, Germany. She is the daughter of a Romanian mother, Doina, and a German father, Hubert.

Honours

Club
FCR 2001 Duisburg
DFB-Pokal: Winner 2008–09, 2009–10, Runner-up 2006–07
UEFA Women's Champions League: Winner 2008–09

1. FFC Frankfurt
UEFA Women's Champions League: Winner 2014–15
DFB-Pokal: Winner 2013–14

FC Bayern Munchen
Frauen-Bundesliga: Winner 2020–21

International
FIFA World Cup: Winner 2007
UEFA European Championship: Winner 2009, 2013
Summer Olympic Games: Bronze medal 2008, Gold medal 2016
FIFA U-19 Women's World Championship: Winner 2004
UEFA Women's U-19 Championship: Runner-up 2004
Algarve Cup: Winner 2014

Individual
Silbernes Lorbeerblatt: 2007
Goal of the Month: September 2007
2004 FIFA U-19 Women's World Championship All star team

References

External links

 Profile at DFB 
 Player German domestic football stats at DFB 
 
 
 
 
 

1986 births
Living people
Sportspeople from Regensburg
German women's footballers
German people of Romanian descent
Germany women's international footballers
FC Bayern Munich (women) players
FCR 2001 Duisburg players
1. FFC Frankfurt players
Footballers at the 2008 Summer Olympics
Footballers at the 2016 Summer Olympics
Olympic gold medalists for Germany
Olympic bronze medalists for Germany
Olympic medalists in football
2007 FIFA Women's World Cup players
2011 FIFA Women's World Cup players
2015 FIFA Women's World Cup players
Medalists at the 2008 Summer Olympics
Medalists at the 2016 Summer Olympics
FIFA Women's World Cup-winning players
Women's association football midfielders
Frauen-Bundesliga players
Olympic footballers of Germany
UEFA Women's Championship-winning players
FIFA Century Club
Footballers from Bavaria